The Yalta Rally (also known as Yalta Rally Fest and Prime Yalta Rally) is a motorsport event for rally cars, located in Yalta, Ukraine at the Crimea peninsula. The first edition of the rally was held in 1986 and was held for 4 years, before it was canceled in the 1990s. In 2005 the Yalta Rally was revived as part of the Ukrainian Rally Championship. In 2011 the rally became part of the Intercontinental Rally Challenge with Juho Hänninen becoming the first international winner in the event. The event continued to be part of the IRC before its merger with the European Rally Championship in 2013.

Following the annexation of Crimea by the Russian Federation, the rally was cancelled. A revival of the event was scheduled in 2018 as part of the Russia Cup, but that event was cancelled as well.

List of winners
Sourced from:

  Oleksandr Saliuk Jr. raced with Kazakh racing license in 2013

References

External links
 The official website for the rally

Rally competitions in Ukraine
Intercontinental Rally Challenge rallies
Sport in Yalta
Sports competitions in Crimea